Cesta is a settlement in the hills above the right bank of the Sava River in the Municipality of Krško in eastern Slovenia. The area is part of the traditional region of Lower Carniola. It is now included with the rest of the municipality in the Lower Sava Statistical Region.

The ruin of the medieval Krško Castle lies in the territory of the settlement.

References

External links
Cesta on Geopedia

Populated places in the Municipality of Krško